Venya may refer to:
Venya, a diminutive of the Russian male first name Veniamin
Venya, a diminutive of the Russian male first name Avenir
Venya, a diminutive of the Russian female first name Avenira
Venya, a diminutive of the Russian male first name Aventin
Venya, a diminutive of the Russian female first name Aventina
Venya Drkin, stage name of Alexander Litvinov (1970–1999), Russian folk singer
Venya, the rat from the Russian computer-animated movie Space Dogs
Venya, the third-level of Mount Celestia, a plane of existence in the Dungeons & Dragons fantasy role-playing game
Venya, the main character in the Moscow-Petushki prose poem by Venedikt Yerofeyev